The 1992 Honduran Cup was the third edition of the Honduran Cup and the first one since 1972.  Real C.D. España won its 2nd title after beating C.D. Victoria in the final.  With the win, Real España qualified to the 1993 CONCACAF Cup Winners Cup.

Group stage
Played in 3 groups in a home and away system qualifying the top 3 and the best runner-up.

Group A

 Real España and Platense forced to a re-match to decide the group's winners.

Group B

 Olimpia and Motagua forced to a re-match to decide the group's winners.

Group C

 Victoria and Petrotela forced to a re-match to decide the group's winners.

Best losers
The fourth semifinal spot was selected from the three re-match games, the team with the least worst record.

Semifinals

 Victoria won 1–0 on aggregated.

 Real España 1–1 Olimpia on aggregated.  Real España won on penalty shoot-outs.

Final

 Real España won 4–2 on aggregated.

Known results

Group A

Group B

References

Honduran Cup seasons
Cup